Charles Robert Sherman (c. September 26, 1788 – June 24, 1829) was an American lawyer and public servant. Of his 11 children, four became prominent public figures during and after the Civil War.

Life and career
Sherman was born in Norwalk, Connecticut, the son of Taylor Sherman, a judge and state representative. He studied law in the office of a Mr. Chapman in Newtown and was admitted to the bar in 1809.  He married Mary Hoyt in 1810 and then moved to Lancaster, Ohio, where he was successful as a lawyer in private practice. In the War of 1812, he served as a Major of the Ohio Militia. In 1823 he became a judge in the Ohio Supreme Court, where he continued to serve until his sudden death in 1829. The Supreme Court rode a circuit in those days, and Sherman died while holding court in Lebanon, Ohio, where he was buried. He was later re-interred in Elmwood Cemetery, Lancaster, Ohio.

Judge Sherman left his widow with no means of support and eleven children, the oldest eighteen years of age, the youngest an infant.  Among them were US Judge Charles Taylor Sherman and William Tecumseh Sherman, who was sent to live with Judge Sherman's friend Thomas Ewing and his wife Maria, and who would famously serve as a General in the U.S. Army during the American Civil War.  Another son was John Sherman, who would become a successful Republican Party politician, U.S. Senator, and Cabinet Secretary.  His youngest son, Hoyt Sherman, would also become notable as a military officer, politician, and businessman.

The Sherman family were members of the Presbyterian Church in Lancaster. He was a trustee of Ohio University.

Notes

References
 Hirshson, Stanley P., The White Tecumseh: A Biography of General William T. Sherman, John Wiley & Sons, 1997, .
 William J. Reese, "Sketch of the Life of Judge Charles R. Sherman," William T. Sherman Pamphlets, Ohio Historical Society.  (Reese married one of Charles Sherman's daughters.)

External links
 The Sherman-Ewing family of Ohio
 Biography of son John Sherman
  Sherman Genealogy Including Families of Essex, Suffolk and Norfolk, England By Thomas Townsend Sherman

1788 births
1829 deaths
Justices of the Ohio Supreme Court
Ohio University trustees
People from Lancaster, Ohio
Politicians from Norwalk, Connecticut
American militiamen in the War of 1812
Sherman family (U.S.)
U.S. state supreme court judges admitted to the practice of law by reading law
19th-century American judges